HeavyLift Cargo Airlines Pty Ltd was an Australian cargo airline headquartered now in Los Angeles, United States. It started operations in 2004 and operates scheduled and charter cargo services. HeavyLift took over passenger airline OzJet in 2008. HeavyLift sold Ozjet and its passenger aircraft to Air Australia in 2009. Heavylift transferred its business to the United States once the Australian Government banned B727/737 stage III aircraft.

Destinations
Heavylift operated worldwide charter cargo services.

Fleet

As of November 2010 the Heavylift Cargo Airlines fleet consists of:

1 Boeing 727-100F Retired
2 Boeing 727-200F Retired
1 Short Belfast Retired
4 Douglas DC8-71F Current

The Belfast is now stored at Cairns Airport. During 2006 work was also underway at Bournemouth Airport to refurbish another aircraft once operated by HeavyLift's unrelated namesake UK airline, the unique Conroy CL-44-0; however it has been reported on various aviation internet message boards that this aircraft will not be delivered. A feature of the airline is that most of its aircraft are not registered in Australia, but in the Philippines.

In May 2008 Heavylift bought passenger airline OzJet giving it access to an Australia air operator's certificate. Ozjet discontinued passenger operations in May 2009.

See also

List of airlines of Australia

References

External links

Airlines established in 2002
Australian companies established in 2002
Cargo airlines of Australia